Hallet Township is a township in Hodgeman County, Kansas, USA.  It has a population of 55.

Geography

References
 USGS Geographic Names Information System (GNIS)

External links
 City-Data.com

Townships in Hodgeman County, Kansas
Townships in Kansas